CatSper4, is a protein which in humans is encoded by the CATSPER4 gene. CatSper1 is a member of the cation channels of sperm family of protein. The four proteins in this family together form a Ca2+-permeant ion channel specific essential for the correct function of sperm cells.

References

Ion channels